"Helen Wheels" is a song by the British–American rock band Paul McCartney and Wings. The song was named after Paul and Linda McCartney's Land Rover, which they nicknamed "Hell on Wheels".

Release
The song was released as a single (with "Country Dreamer" on the B-side) prior to Band on the Run and was not included on the British release of the album. However, Capitol Records vice president of promotion Al Coury persuaded McCartney to include it on the American release. The song peaked at number 10 in the US chart on 12 January 1974 and at number 12 in the UK chart.

In the book Paul McCartney In His Own Words published in 1976, McCartney said:
"Helen Wheels is our Land Rover. It's a name we gave to our Land Rover, which is a trusted vehicle that gets us around Scotland. It takes us up to the Shetland Islands and down to London. The song starts off in Glasgow, and it goes past Carlisle, goes to Kendal, Liverpool, Birmingham and London. It's the route coming down from our Scottish farm to London, so it's really the story of the trip down. Little images along the way. Liverpool is on the West coast of England, so that is all that means."

The music video was directed by Michael Lindsay-Hogg (who also directed the Beatles' final movie Let it Be) and shows McCartney singing and playing his left-handed Rickenbacker 4001 bass, Linda playing a Minimoog synthesizer and singing backing vocals, Denny Laine playing his Fender Telecaster and singing backing vocals while additional footage shows McCartney doubling on drums and lead guitar in place of departed members Denny Seiwell and Henry McCullough, both of whom quit the band prior to the sessions for Band on the Run, and the trio in a car.

Billboard described "Helen Wheels" as a "driving rock tune" with a "catchy chorus."  Cash Box called it "a savage rocker from a band that has become more proficient at rock with each outing."

It was later included on The 7" Singles Box in 2022.

Cover versions
The song was covered by Def Leppard on the album The Art of McCartney in 2014.

Personnel
Paul McCartney – lead vocals, guitar, bass guitar, drums
Linda McCartney – backing vocals, keyboards
Denny Laine – backing vocals, guitar

Notes

Paul McCartney songs
1973 singles
Paul McCartney and Wings songs
Songs written by Paul McCartney
Songs written by Linda McCartney
Apple Records singles
Song recordings produced by Paul McCartney
Music published by MPL Music Publishing
Music videos directed by Michael Lindsay-Hogg
Songs about cars